The sand wrasse, Ammolabrus dicrus, is a species of wrasse endemic to Oahu, Hawaii. They prefer open, sandy substrates, where they hunt for zooplankton near the ocean floor. This species is the only known member of its genus.

References

Labridae
Monotypic fish genera
Fish described in 1997